Mikhail Yuriyevich Balandin (July 27, 1980 – September 7, 2011) was a Russian professional ice hockey player. Balandin played for Lokomotiv Yaroslavl of the Kontinental Hockey League (KHL) at the time of his death. Balandin had also played for Salavat Yulaev Ufa, HC Lada Togliatti, HC CSKA Moscow, Khimik Mytishchi, Atlant Mytishchi and UHC Dynamo in Russia. Balandin won a silver medal with the Russian team at the 2000 World Junior Ice Hockey Championships.

Death
On September 7, 2011, Balandin was killed, when a Yakovlev Yak-42 passenger aircraft, carrying nearly his entire Lokomotiv team, crashed just outside Yaroslavl, Russia. The team was traveling to Minsk to play their opening game of the season, with its coaching staff and prospects. Lokomotiv officials said "'everyone from the main roster was on the plane plus four players from the youth team.'"

See also
List of ice hockey players who died during their playing career

References

External links

1980 births
2011 deaths
Atlant Moscow Oblast players
HC CSKA Moscow players
Dizel Penza players
HC Dynamo Moscow players
Krylya Sovetov Moscow players
HC Lada Togliatti players
Lokomotiv Yaroslavl players
Sportspeople from Lipetsk
Russian ice hockey defencemen
Salavat Yulaev Ufa players
Victims of the Lokomotiv Yaroslavl plane crash